Ephyriades is a genus in the skippers (Hesperiidae) butterfly family. All the species are found in Central America and the Caribbean.

Species
Recognised species in the genus Ephyriades include:
Ephyriades arcas (Drury, 1773) - Caribbean duskywing
Ephyriades brunnea (Herrich-Schäffer, 1865) - Florida duskywing
Ephyriades dominicensis Bell & Comstock, 1948
Ephyriades eugramma (Mabille, 1888) - Chiriqui skipper
Ephyriades jamaicensis (Möschler, 1879)
Ephyriades zephodes (Hübner, 1825) - zephodes duskywing

References and external links

Ephyriades from Markku Savela's Lepidoptera site.

Erynnini
Hesperiidae genera
Taxa named by Jacob Hübner